Max Schneider (20 July 1875 – 5 May 1967) was a German music historian.

Life 
Born in Eisleben, Schneider studied musicology at the University of Leipzig with Hermann Kretzschmar and Hugo Riemann and composition with Salomon Jadassohn. After his time as second Kapellmeister in Halle from 1897 to 1901, he continued his studies of music history with Kretzschmar. In 1904, he moved to Berlin, where he worked from 1905 to 1915 as a "scientific assistant" at the Alte Bibliothek.

At the Royal Music Institute of Berlin, Schneider learnt orchestration and received the title of professor in 1913. In 1915, he accepted a professorship at the University of Breslau; two years later he obtained his doctorate with a dissertation on the beginnings of the basso continuo. In 1928, he succeeded Arnold Schering as professor for musicology at the Martin-Luther-University of Halle-Wittenberg. After 1933, Schneider was member of the organizations National Socialist Teachers League, National Socialist German Lecturers League, and the Reichsluftschutzbund. In December 1938 he resigned from his post as Dean of the Faculty of Philosophy, which he had held since 1936, "because of the consequences of the "Rosenberg Politic".

After 1945 he joined the Free German Trade Union Federation. He taught far beyond his Emeritus in 1950 until 1962. Furthermore he taught music history and score playing at the  founded in 1947.

Schneider took on the editorship of the Bach-Jahrbuch of the Neue Bachgesellschaft. This annual publication had been suspended during the war years and the previous editor Arnold Schering had died. The Jahrbuch covering the years 1940-1948 came out in 1947 as Volume 37 (published by Breitkopf & Härtel, Leipzig). 
Schneider was co-editor of the Archiv für Musikwissenschaft (1918–1927), the Händel-Jahrbuch (1955–1967), the Hallische Händel-Ausgabe (from 1955) as well as the series  (from 1961). He dealt almost exclusively with the history of music from the late 16th to the middle of the 18th century, in particular with performance practice and source material. Schneider published important studies on Johann Sebastian Bach's biography and the sources of his works and helped to rehabilitate Georg Philipp Telemann.

In 1961 he was awarded the Handel Prize.

Schneider died in Halle at age 91.

References

Further reading 
 Christoph Wolff: Schneider, Max. In Grove Dictionary of Music and Musicians. 2nd edition, edited by Stanley Sadie. Macmillan, London 2001, 
 Richard Schaal: Schneider, Max. In Ludwig Finscher (edit.): Die Musik in Geschichte und Gegenwart. Second edition, personal part, volume 14 (Riccati – Schönstein). Bärenreiter/Metzler, Kassel among others 2005,  (On line)
 Gerhard Scheuermann: Das Breslau-Lexikon, Band 2. Laumann-Verlag, Dülmen 1994, .

External links 
 
 Max Schneider in Catalogus Professorum Halensis
 Max Schneider in Encyclopedia Britannica

20th-century German musicologists
German music historians
Bach scholars
Academic staff of the University of Wrocław
Recipients of the Patriotic Order of Merit in gold
Handel Prize winners
1875 births
1967 deaths
People from Eisleben